St. Peter or St. Peter's may refer to:

Places

Australia 
 , a suburb of Sydney, New South Wales

Canada
 St. Peter's, Nova Scotia
 Rural Municipality of St. Peter No. 369, Saskatchewan

Europe 
 St. Peter (Graz), Austria
 Sveti Petar u Šumi (Saint Peter in the Woods), Istria, Croatia
 St Peter, Jersey, Channel Islands
 Sint Pieter, Maastricht, Netherlands
 Saint Petersburg, Russia
 St. Peter, Switzerland, Graubunden (Grisons) canton

United States
 St. Petersburg, Florida
 St. Peter, Illinois
 St. Peter, Kansas
 St. Peter, Minnesota
 St. Peters, Missouri
 St. Peter, Wisconsin

Other 
 St. Peter (rugby ground), a rugby ground in Jersey
 St. Peter (shipwreck), an 1873 schooner that shipwrecked in Lake Ontario
 "St. Peter" (song)
 St. Peter Stiftskulinarium, a restaurant in Salzburg, Austria

See also 
 Saint Peter (disambiguation)
 San Pedro (disambiguation)
 Sankt Peter (disambiguation)
 St. Peter's (disambiguation)
 St. Peter's Abbey (disambiguation)
 St. Peter's Basilica (disambiguation)
 St. Peter's Bridge, Ljubljana, Slovenia
 St Peter's Bridge, Burton upon Trent, England
 St. Peter's Cathedral (disambiguation)
 St. Peter's Church (disambiguation)
 St. Peter's College (disambiguation)
 St. Peter's fish, a common name for over a hundred cichlid fish species found in the Sea of Galilee
 St. Peter's keys, a device used for lifting blocks of stone
 St Peter's School (disambiguation)
 St. Peter's Square (disambiguation)
 Saint-Pierre (disambiguation)
 San Pietro (disambiguation)